Valdimar is a given name in Icelandic. Notable persons with that surname include:

First name
Valdimar Bergstað (born 1989), Icelandic equestrian
Valdimar Briem (1848–1930), Icelandic poet, prelate, hymnwriter and translator
Valdimar Grímsson (born 1965), Icelandic handball player
Valdemar, King of Sweden (1239–1302), king in 1250–1275 (in Icelandic Valdimar Birgisson)

Middle name
Kristjan Valdimar "Val" Bjornson, or Val Bjornson (1906-1987), American writer, newspaper editor, and politician

Music
 Valdimar (band), Icelandic musical group

See also
 Valdimarsson
 Waldemar / Valdemar

Icelandic masculine given names